Hans-Peter Pohl (born 30 January 1965 in Triberg im Schwarzwald) is a former German nordic combined skier who competed during the late 1980s and early 1990s. He won the 3 x 10 km team event at the 1988 Winter Olympics in Calgary and also won two medals in the 3 x 10 km team events at the FIS Nordic World Ski Championships with a gold in 1987 (with West Germany) and a bronze in 1993 (with a unified Germany).

External links 
 
 

1965 births
Living people
German male Nordic combined skiers
Olympic Nordic combined skiers of West Germany
Olympic Nordic combined skiers of Germany
Nordic combined skiers at the 1988 Winter Olympics
Nordic combined skiers at the 1992 Winter Olympics
Olympic medalists in Nordic combined
FIS Nordic World Ski Championships medalists in Nordic combined
Medalists at the 1988 Winter Olympics
Olympic gold medalists for West Germany
People from Schwarzwald-Baar-Kreis
Sportspeople from Freiburg (region)